A carillon is a musical instrument of bells in the percussion family.

Carillon, the carillon, or le carillon may also refer to:

Geography
 Carillon (electoral district), Manitoba, Canada
 Carillon, Richmond, Virginia, US
 Carillon, a village and former municipality of Saint-André-d'Argenteuil, Quebec
 Carillon City, a shopping centre in Perth, Western Australia
 Carillon Historical Park, Dayton, Ohio, US
 Carillon Tower, a skyscraper in Charlotte, North Carolina, US

Music
 Carillon (Elgar), a recitation with orchestral accompaniment by Edward Elgar
 Carillon (Murrill), a composition for organ by Herbert Murrill
 "Carillon", a song by Sky from Sky
 Carillons (Williams), a composition for orchestra by Grace Williams
 Le Carillon (EP), an EP by The Autumns
 Le carillon, a ballet by Jules Massenet
 Carillon de Westminster, a composition for organ by Louis Vierne
 "Carillon-Sortie", a composition by Henri Mulet

Newspapers
 Le Carillon, Hawkesbury, Ontario
 The Carillon (Steinbach), Steinbach, Manitoba
 The Carillon (Regina), University of Regina

See also
 Carillion, a former British multinational company